Jonathan Medved (born September 16, 1955) is a serial entrepreneur, venture capitalist and angel investor in Israel's high-tech scene. He is the founder and CEO of OurCrowd, a leading equity crowdfunding platform. Medved was named one of the "50 Most Influential Jews" by the Jerusalem Post, where he was dubbed "the startup nation's guru." Jon lives in Jerusalem with his wife Jane, their children and grandchildren.

Early life
Medved was born into a traditional but secular Jewish family in San Diego, California, the son of Renate (Hirsch) and David Bernard Medved, a Navy veteran and scientist. He was raised in San Diego, California, where his father worked for the defense contractor Convair and later for NASA. Medved attended Palisades High School when the family moved to Los Angeles, California. He attended UC Berkeley, located in Berkeley, California.

He has four brothers, including radio talk show host and movie critic Michael Medved.

Career
Medved is the founder and CEO of OurCrowd, an equity crowdfunding platform that connects its "crowd" of accredited investors to funding startup investments. OurCrowd was started in 2013 and has its global headquarters in Jerusalem with additional offices in Tel Aviv, San Diego, New York, Toronto, London, Hong Kong, Singapore, and Sydney. As of November 2018, OurCrowd has raised $800M in 160 startup companies and venture funds in its portfolio.

Between 2006-2012, Medved was the co-founder and CEO of Vringo, a leader in the innovation, development and monetization of mobile technologies and intellectual property. Medved led Vringo to a successful completion of its IPO in June 2010, and it trades today on NASDAQ under the symbol VRNG.

In 1995, Medved co-founded Israel Seed Partners with Michael Eisenberg and Neil Cohen in a garage with $2 million in funding.

Saul Singer and Dan Senor, in their best-selling book, Start-up Nation, describe Medved as "one of Israel's legendary business ambassadors….[he] has taken on a role that – in any other country – would typically belong to the local Chamber of Commerce, Minister of Trade, or Foreign Secretary."

Personal life
Although Medved disliked many religious practices growing up, he and Jane, his wife, became more religious over time in their Venice, California community. His parents also became religious (returning to the Orthodox Judaism of their youth) as well as his in-laws. He credits Venice's Rabbi Daniel Lapin with helping them on that path and making them feel accepted.

Medved and his family made aliyah in 1980.

Jane Medved is a published poet. They have four children, three sons and a daughter. Their sons – Moshe, Yossi, and Ithamar – have careers in law, film, and medicine. Daughter Nina was born in 1993 or 1994 in Jerusalem. She married Yoni Tokayer in June 2015. The Tokayers perform Jewish inspirational music under the name Yonina Music. Nina gave birth to daughter Ashira in 2016. They released Emet Pshuta, an album of original music, in 2017. They have toured internationally.

References

1955 births
Living people
Angel investors
Israeli chief executives
Israeli company founders
University of California, Berkeley alumni
Israeli Venture capitalists